is a railway station in Kita-ku, Nagoya, Aichi Prefecture, Japan.

Lines

 (Station number: M12)
Central Japan Railway Company
Chūō Main Line
Nagoya Railroad
Meitetsu Seto Line
Nagoya Guideway Bus
Yutorīto Line (Station number: Y01)

Layout

Nagoya Municipal Subway

Platforms

JR Central

Platforms

Nagoya Railroad

Platforms

Nagoya Guideway Bus

Platforms

Adjacent stations

!colspan=5|JR Central

|-
!colspan=5|Nagoya Railroad

|-
!colspan=5|Nagoya Guideway Bus

References

External links
 

Railway stations in Aichi Prefecture